Mir Mughal is a tribe found both in the North-Indian state of Jammu & Kashmir. The word Mir is a shortened form of the Persian word mirza, meaning a person of princely blood. It was also a common title among the Sayyids of the Kashmir Valley, and the way the two groups distinguish themselves is by the Sayyids prefixing the word 'Mir' to their names e.g., Mir Mubarak and Mir Maqbool, whereas the non-syeds use it as suffix to their names. (viz., Aziz Mir, Gaffar Mir etc.)

See also 

 Mir

References 

Social groups of Jammu and Kashmir